The Teapot Dome scandal was a bribery incident in the United States that took place during the administration of President Warren G. Harding. Teapot Dome may also refer to:

Teapot Rock, a rock formation in Natrona County, Wyoming associated with the scandal
Teapot Dome Service Station, a former service station in Zillah, Washington listed on the National Register of Historic Places